is a hack and slash video game developed and published by FromSoftware for the PlayStation 2, based on the legendary samurai, Minamoto no Yoshitsune.

The game was later re-released with additional content (such as characters and levels) and two-player cooperative or competitive modes. This new version was titled  (shura meaning "mayhem" or "carnage").

Gameplay
Developers described the game as a cross between real-time strategy games and typical third-person 3D action games.
The game displays a 3rd person view of the area surrounding the player in a real-time strategic setting, similar to Koei's Dynasty Warriors. There are many stages in which the goal is to guide the troops safely across the battlefield while protecting them.

Characters
 Minamoto no Yoshitsune
 Benkei
 "Ushiwakamaru"

Reception 
In the week of its release, Yoshitsune Eiyūden: The Story of Hero Yoshitsune was the third best-selling console game in Japan, with 41,927 copies sold.

References

External links 
  

2005 video games
Cultural depictions of Minamoto no Yoshitsune
FromSoftware games
Japan-exclusive video games
PlayStation 2 games
PlayStation 2-only games
Video games with historical settings
Multiplayer and single-player video games
Real-time strategy video games
Video games based on real people
Video games developed in Japan